Rimantas Sinkevičius (born 3 April 1952) is a Lithuanian politician, Minister of Economy and Innovation (2020),  former Minister of Transport and Communications of Lithuania.

Biography 
In 1970 graduated from Kavarskas high school and entered Institute of polytechnics in Kaunas, faculty of Chemical technology, which he graduated in 1975 and acquired the specialty of inorganic fertilizers and chemical technology engineer.

1980–2000 Worked at the company „Achema“ in Jonava (formerly state-owned company „Azotas“). Held various positions. 1980–1983 was the shift supervisor, year 1983–1993 – Foreman and chief of laboratory, from 1993 to 1997 – Deputy Director of the center for Innovation and progress, 1997–2000 – Deputy Director for Commerce, Head of marketing department. 2004–2008 was a development director of the concern „Achema Group“.

2000–2004 was a member of the 8th Parliament of the Republic of Lithuania. Elected in constituency of Jonava No. 60.
Since 13 December 2012, Minister of Transport and Communications at the Republic of Lithuania.

A member of Council in Lithuanian Social Democrats Party, a chairperson of Jonava division.

Family 

Married. Wife Ligita is chief specialist at the Environmental Protection Agency under the Ministry of Environment. They have two children. Son Mindaugas Sinkevičius is a Minister of Economy, daughter Rūta is assistant to Vilnius district court judge.

References 

Ministers of Transport and Communications of Lithuania
Ministers of Economy of Lithuania
Social Democratic Party of Lithuania politicians
Social Democratic Labour Party of Lithuania politicians
Politicians from Jonava
1952 births
Living people
People from Anykščiai
Members of the Seimas
21st-century Lithuanian politicians